"The Way We Were" is a song by American singer Barbra Streisand from her fifteenth studio album of the same name. It was released as the album's lead single on September 27, 1973, through Columbia Records. The 7" single was distributed in two different formats, with the standard edition featuring B-side track "What Are You Doing the Rest of Your Life?"; the Mexico release instead included an instrumental B-side. The song was written by Alan Bergman, Marilyn Bergman, and Marvin Hamlisch, while production was solely handled by Marty Paich. "The Way We Were" was specifically produced for the record, in addition to three other tracks, including her then-upcoming single "All in Love Is Fair" (1974).

Its lyrics detail the melancholic relationship between the two main characters in the 1973 film of the same name. Its appeal was noted by several music critics, who felt its impact helped revive Streisand's career. The song also won two Academy Awards, which were credited to the songwriters of the track. The single was also a commercial success, topping the charts in both Canada and the United States, while peaking in the top 40 in Australia and the United Kingdom. Additionally, "The Way We Were" was 1974's most successful recording in the United States, where it was placed at number one on the Billboard Year-End Hot 100 singles list. It has since been certified Platinum by the RIAA for sales of over one million units. Streisand has also included "The Way We Were" on various compilation albums, with it most recently appearing on 2010's Barbra: The Ultimate Collection.

Several renditions and versions of the single exist, including one by American singer Andy Williams, who sang it for his thirty-second studio album of the same name in 1974. American band Gladys Knight & the Pips also recorded a cover for I Feel a Song (1974), which was commercially successful; it reached number four in the United Kingdom and number 11 in the United States.

Development and release 
American composer and producer Marvin Hamlisch created the final melody for "The Way We Were", which initially was a problem between himself and the singer. Streisand had asked Hamlisch to produce a composition in minor key, but he instead wrote it in major key due to his fear of the song's lyrics being revealed too quickly.
Shortly following the commercial success of "The Way We Were", Columbia Records began compiling tracks for the singer's then-upcoming fifteenth studio album. Since time was limited, the record consists of several non-album compositions recorded by Streisand, including the aforementioned title and her preceding single "All in Love Is Fair" (1974). According to the liner notes of her 1991 greatest hits album Just for the Record, "The Way We Were", "All in Love is Fair", "Being at War with Each Other", and "Something So Right" were the only tracks specifically created for the album. The recording and two other variants were also included on the original soundtrack for the film: the original, the instrumental, and the "Finale" version. Individually, it was released as a 7" single in the United States on September 27, 1973, through Columbia Records; the aforementioned edition included the studio version of "The Way We Were", in addition to the B-side single "What Are You Doing the Rest of Your Life?", a cover of the 1969 Michael Dees song. The Japanese release featured the same versions with slightly different durations, while the version intended for the Mexico market includes the instrumental version of "The Way We Were" as the B-side track instead.

Lyrical interpretation 
Hamlisch and Alan and Marilyn Bergman wrote "The Way We Were" while Marty Paich handled its production. In particular, the lyrics detail the personal life of Katie Morosky, the character she portrays in the film. Specifically, her troubling relationship with Robert Redford's Hubbell Gardiner is explained, "Memories light the corners of my mind / Misty watercolor memories of the way we were" and "Memories may be beautiful and yet". Streisand sings, "What's too painful to remember / We quickly choose to forget", where she longs for nostalgia, which Rolling Stones Stephen Holden described as an implication that "resonate[s] in the current social malaise". In the beginning of what seems to be a bridge, she whispers, "If we had the chance to do it all again / Tell me would we? Could we?".

Legacy and accolades 

"The Way We Were" received significant success after its original release in North America; Jon Landau of Rolling Stone claimed that its impact proved worthy enough to revive her career as a musical artist. However, he was more critical of the singer "ignor[ing] the line-by-line variations in [the] song's meaning". Nevertheless, the mass appeal of the single was labeled by Turner Classic Movies's Andrea Passafiume as "one of the most recognizable songs in the world". Hamlisch and the Bergmans won the Academy Award for Best Original Song at the 46th Academy Awards; the former musician also won the Oscar for Best Original Score for the film. The tune also won the Golden Globe Award for Best Original Song in 1974 and the Grammy Award for Song of the Year in 1975. According to the National Endowment for the Arts and Recording Industry Association of America (RIAA) in their list of the top 365 "Songs of the Century", the single was placed at number 298.

Commercial performance 
In the United States, "The Way We Were" debuted at number 92 on the Billboard Hot 100 for the week ending November 24, 1973, where it served as the issue's seventh-highest debut. After steadily climbing the list for ten consecutive weeks, it topped the chart on February 2, 1974, where it knocked Ringo Starr's version of "You're Sixteen" (1973) from the highest spot. After being temporarily displaced by The Love Unlimited Orchestra's debut single "Love's Theme", Streisand reclaimed the number one rank for two more weeks beginning February 16 of the same year. "The Way We Were" departed Billboards Hot 100 on April 27 at the position of number 53; in total, it spent 23 consecutive weeks among the chart's ranking. On the Billboard Year-End Hot 100 singles of 1974 list, the single also topped the chart on the list of the year's 100 highest-ranking songs. On August 19, 1997, in addition to several of Streisand's recordings, "The Way We Were" was certified Platinum in the United States by the RIAA for sales exceeding one million copies. On the Billboard Adult Contemporary chart, where it was then referred to as the Easy Listening chart, it reached the number one spot on January 12, 1974, and held that position for two weeks.

Outside of Streisand's native country, the single found similar commercial success. In Canada, "The Way We Were" entered the chart compiled by RPM at number 45, where it was the week's third-highest debut. On its seventh week, it reached the top position that was previously held by Terry Jacks' cover of "Seasons in the Sun" (1973). It spent a total of 13 weeks in Canada before departing at its position at number 58. It also topped the Adult Contemporary chart in its 11th week, also in 1974. In their year-end chart, "The Way We Were" was ranked as Canada's eighth best-selling single of 1974. In the final year of Australia's chart compiled by Go-Set, Streisand's recording peaked at number six. It also reached its peak position in the United Kingdom at number 31 for the week of March 30, 1974.

Live performances 
Streisand has performed "The Way We Were" on numerous occasions and is often considered to be one of her signature songs. On her third live album, One Voice (1986), the single was included alongside a live video of the singer performing it. In September 1994, Streisand released The Concert, which also included a live rendition of "The Way We Were" as performed at the Madison Square Garden in Manhattan. At a series of live concerts in 1999 and 2000 in Las Vegas, the singer sang several songs from her catalog and was billed as one of her final live performances; the entirety of the event was then included on Timeless: Live in Concert (2000), including the "Introduction" segment which featured "The Way We Were" in addition to "You'll Never Know", "Something's Coming", and a live interview with actress Shirley MacLaine. The single was also placed on Live in Concert 2006 (2006) and Back to Brooklyn (2013), with its appearance on the latter consisting of a medley of both "The Way We Were" and "Through the Eyes of Love".

Track listings and formats 

Standard edition 7" single
 A1 "The Way We Were" – 3:29
 B1 "What Are You Doing the Rest of Your Life?" – 3:17
Japan 7" single
 A1 "The Way We Were" – 3:30
 B1 "What Are You Doing the Rest of Your Life?" – 3:19

Mexico 7" single
 A1 "The Way We Were" – 3:29
 B1 "The Way We Were (Instrumental Version)" – 2:58

Personnel 
Barbra Streisand - vocals
Paul Humphrey - drums
Carol Kaye - bass
 Marty Paich arranging

Charts

Weekly charts

Year-end charts

All-time charts

Certifications and sales

Cover versions 
Several renditions of "The Way We Were" have been released since its initial distribution in 1973. American singer Andy Williams recorded a cover of the track for his 1974 and thirty-second studio album of the same name. AllMusic's William Ruhlmann was divided on Williams' interpretation and claimed that fans of Streisand's version would not be interested in this one. However, Mike Parker from the Daily Express considered his version and the album as a whole as a classic. American actress and singer Doris Day performed the song in a CBS special, Doris Day Today, in 1975. Bing Crosby recorded the song for his album Feels Good, Feels Right in 1976. He also sang it at his London Palladium concerts that year and in 1977. Dorothy Squires included it for her 1978 LP called "Rain Rain Go Away" which was produced by Norman Newell. In 2008, the singer-songwriter Beyoncé, sang a rendition of the song in front of Streisand herself at the 2008 Kennedy Center Honors. In 2018, the group Il Divo included the translated version "Toi et Moi" on their album Timeless. The song was sung twice on Angel, firstly by Mercedes McNab as Harmony Kendall and later by Andy Hallett as Lorne.

In 2014, Streisand re-recorded the track with Lionel Richie for her thirty-fourth studio album, Partners (2014). Walter Afanasieff's contributions and added background vocals to the aforementioned edition were acclaimed by Los Angeles Times Mikael Wood, who described the composition as a "fluttering" one. "The Way We Were" has also been selected for inclusion on several of Streisand's compilation albums, including Barbra Streisand's Greatest Hits Vol. 2 (1978), Memories (1981), Just for the Record (1991), The Essential Barbra Streisand (2002), and Barbra: The Ultimate Collection (2010).

Gladys Knight & the Pips version

Background and reception 
American R&B band Gladys Knight & the Pips recorded a cover of "The Way We Were" as part of a blend with the song "Try to Remember", released on their 1974 studio album I Feel a Song. The cover/blend was released by Buddah Records on March 14, 1975, in a 7-inch format, paired with the B-side singles "Love Finds Its Own Way" and "The Need to Be". Due to the inclusion of "Try to Remember", the song features additional writing by Tom Jones and Harvey Schmidt. Alex Henderson from AllMusic was surprised regarding their version, calling it an "unlikely remake". He further critiqued Knight's "ironic" spoken monologue on the track by assuming she's "reflecting on the nostalgia that seems to be human nature". However, Rashod Ollison from The Virginian-Pilot declared it a "stirring remake" and liked the track's live orchestra. He further lauded the B-side track "The Need to Be" for being a "deeply soulful declaration of independence". Knight's rendition of "The Way We Were" was sampled in 1993 for "Can It Be All So Simple" by the Wu-Tang Clan.

Chart performance 
On the United States' Billboard Hot 100, "The Way We Were" reached its highest position of number 11 on August 2, 1975. It spent a total of 17 weeks charting before decreasing weekly until meeting its final position at number 57 for the week ending August 16, 1975. In Canada, it peaked at number 29 on the list compiled by RPM. It also entered the Adult Contemporary charts in both the United States and Canada, ranking at numbers two and three, respectively. In the United Kingdom, the Gladys Knight & the Pips version was more successful than Streisand's. It peaked at number four in that country, becoming their first top ten single; it would tie with their 1977 single "Baby, Don't Change Your Mind" as their highest-peaking track.

Track listings and formats 
Standard edition 7" single
 A1 "The Way We Were" / "Try to Remember" – 4:48
 B1 "The Need to Be" – 4:07

United Kingdom 7" single
 A1 "The Way We Were" / "Try to Remember" – 4:45
 B1 "Love Finds Its Own Way" – 3:51

United Kingdom Reissued 7" single
 A1 "The Way We Were" / "Try to Remember" – 4:45
 B1 "Midnight Train to Georgia" – 4:41

Charts

See also 
 Billboard Year-End Hot 100 singles of 1974
 List of Billboard Hot 100 number-one singles of 1974
 List of number-one adult contemporary singles of 1974 (U.S.)
 List of number-one singles of 1974 (Canada)

References

External links 
 

Songs about nostalgia
1973 singles
1973 songs
1970s ballads
Andy Williams songs
Barbra Streisand songs
Barry Manilow songs
Best Original Song Academy Award-winning songs
Best Original Song Golden Globe winning songs
Grammy Award for Song of the Year
Billboard Hot 100 number-one singles
Cashbox number-one singles
RPM Top Singles number-one singles
Buddah Records singles
Columbia Records singles
Gladys Knight & the Pips songs
Love themes
The Manhattans songs
Songs with lyrics by Alan Bergman
Songs with lyrics by Marilyn Bergman
Songs written by Marvin Hamlisch
Songs written for films